Renel Brooks-Moon (born September 22, 1958), known on-air simply as Renel, is the public address announcer for the San Francisco Giants since 2000, and a former radio personality, having hosted shows on KMEL, KISQ, and KBLX.

Biography 
Born in Oakland, California, Brooks-Moon was raised throughout the Bay Area. She attended Woodside High School from 1972-1976. Brooks-Moon then attended Mills College, where she graduated in 1981 with a B.A. in English.

In 1986, she joined "The Morning Zoo" of the radio station KMEL. and also worked with KFRC. In 1997, she joined KISQ, known later as "98.1 KISS FM", where she was a radio personality for over 20 years until 2009. A year later, she returned to KISQ to do their morning show, and had a noon-time role. In 2016, she joined KBLX.

In 2000, Brooks-Moon became the second full-time female public address announcer in Major League Baseball history when she joined the San Francisco Giants. Sherry Davis, who announced for the team for its last seven seasons at Candlestick Park (1993–1999), preceded Brooks-Moon, who took over for Davis when the Giants moved from Candlestick to AT&T Park in 2000.

Brooks-Moon was recognized by the Baseball Hall of Fame as the first female announcer of a championship game in any professional sport for her role in the 2002 World Series. Her scorecard from Game 3 is on display in the Hall of Fame at Cooperstown, New York. 8 years later, the Giants won the World Series, when San Francisco defeated the Texas Rangers in 5 games. They won the World Series again in 2012 in a 4-game sweep over the Detroit Tigers, and won the 2014 World Series in 7 games over the Kansas City Royals.

In July 2018, Brooks-Moon served as the "Mistress of Ceremonies" at the inauguration of London Breed, the 45th Mayor of San Francisco.

References 

1958 births
Living people
American radio personalities
Major League Baseball public address announcers
National Football League public address announcers
Mills College alumni
People from Oakland, California
San Francisco Giants personnel